Black River High School is a high school located in Black River, Jamaica.

History 
The Black River High School is situated about half a mile from the town of Black River.  The Anglican Church in Black River acquired 12 acres of land through loans and grants. The Francis' family donated 4 acres making a total of 16 acres on which the Government built the Black River High School.

The Junior Secondary school was opened in September 1970 to house 655 students on a straight shift from grades 7-9; Mr. E A Harris was appointed as Principal and his wife Mrs. B. J Harris as Vice-Principal.  

In 1974, the school was put on a two shift system since grades 10 and 11 were added. The word "Junior" was dropped from the name of the school.

In 1984, Mr. J Scott was appointed Principal and the school was upgraded to Black River High in September 1988.  By 1990 Mr. R Gayle became the Acting Principal.

The fourth Principal Rev. B Buchanan became active in May 1994. By 1995 the school went on a straight shift for a year; however by 1996 it went back to two shifts.

In September 1998, Mr. J Beckford introduced the Caribbean Advanced Proficiency Examination (CAPE).  The subjects initially offered were Caribbean Studies, History, Mathematics and Statistics and students did outstanding in these subjects. Today the subjects offered have increased to include the Sciences (Chemistry, Biology, Physics and Environmental Science), Sociology, Literature in English and Management of Business, Pure Mathematics, Add Mathematics, Law and Economics among others.

The school offers a range of extra curricular activities. In 2009, they were winners of the TVJ's All Together Sing competition for high school choirs in Jamaica after entering for the first time. They have received numerous gold, silver, and bronze medals for participating in the Jamaica Cultural Development Commission (JCDC) competition on a yearly basis. In recent years they have dominated the Theater Arts areas and have sent students overseas to represent Jamaica in competitions. The School has various clubs and societies that students can participate in.

References 

Schools in Jamaica
Educational institutions established in 1970
Buildings and structures in Saint Elizabeth Parish
1970 establishments in Jamaica